Jamie Stanton (born June 16, 1994), also known as James Stanton, is an American male Paralympic alpine skier. He has competed at the Winter Paralympics in 2014 and 2018.

Career 
He made his Paralympic debut for United States at the 2014 Winter Paralympics and went medalless after competing in the alpine skiing events. He competed at the 2014 Winter Paralympics as James Stanton.

He also represented United States at the 2018 Winter Paralympics and competed as Jamie Stanton. Jamie Stanton claimed his first Paralympic medal at the 2018 Winter Paralympics, claiming a bronze medal in the men's slalom standing event.

References

External links 
 
 

1994 births
Living people
American male alpine skiers
Paralympic alpine skiers of the United States
Paralympic bronze medalists for the United States
Alpine skiers at the 2014 Winter Paralympics
Alpine skiers at the 2018 Winter Paralympics
Medalists at the 2018 Winter Paralympics
People from Rochester Hills, Michigan
Paralympic medalists in alpine skiing